Charles Reeves may refer to:

Charles Reeves (businessman)
Charles Reeves (architect)